Mariano Cuadra Medina (12 May 1912 – 2 March 1981) was a Spanish general who served as Minister of the Air of Spain between 1974 and 1975, during the Francoist dictatorship.

References

1912 births
1981 deaths
Defence ministers of Spain
Government ministers during the Francoist dictatorship